Pokeweed mosaic virus is a species of virus in the genus Potyvirus. It is known to infect American pokeweed (Phytolacca americana), in which it causes mosaic symptoms.

References

External links 
 iNaturalist – Pokeweed mosaic virus

Viral plant pathogens and diseases
Potyviruses